In the United States, Flag Day is celebrated on June 14. It commemorates the adoption of the flag of the United States on June 14, 1777, by resolution of the Second Continental Congress. 
The Flag Resolution, passed on June 14, 1777, stated: "Resolved, That the flag of the thirteen United States be thirteen stripes, alternate red and white; that the union be thirteen stars, white in a blue field, representing a new constellation."

The United States Army also celebrates the U.S. Army birthday on this date; Congress adopted "the American continental army" after reaching a consensus position in the Committee of the Whole on June 14, 1775.

In 1916, President Woodrow Wilson issued a proclamation that officially established June 14 as Flag Day; on August 3, 1949, National Flag Day was established by an Act of Congress. Flag Day is not an official federal holiday. Title 36 of the United States Code, Subtitle I, Part A, CHAPTER 1, § 110 is the official statute on Flag Day; however, it is at the president's discretion to officially proclaim the observance. On June 14, 1937, Pennsylvania became the first U.S. state to celebrate Flag Day as a state holiday, beginning in the town of Rennerdale. New York Consolidated Laws designate the second Sunday in June as Flag Day, a state holiday.

Perhaps the oldest continuing Flag Day parade is in Fairfield, Washington. Beginning in 1909 or 1910, Fairfield has held a parade every year since, with the possible exception of 1918 and 2020, and celebrated the "Centennial" parade in 2010, along with some other commemorative events. Appleton, Wisconsin, claims to be the oldest National Flag Day parade in the nation, held annually since 1950.

Quincy, Massachusetts, has had an annual Flag Day parade since 1952 and claims it "is the longest-running parade of its kind" in the U.S. The largest Flag Day parade had been held annually in Troy, New York until 2017, which based its parade on the Quincy parade and typically draws 50,000 spectators. In addition, the Three Oaks, Michigan, Flag Day Parade is held annually on the weekend of Flag Day and is a three-day event and they claim to have the largest flag day parade in the nation as well as the oldest.

History 

Several people and/or organizations played instrumental roles in the establishment of a national Flag Day celebration. They are identified here in chronological order.

1861, George Morris
The earliest reference to the suggestion of a "Flag Day" is cited in Kansas: a Cyclopedia of State History, published by Standard Publishing Company of Chicago in 1912. It credits George Morris of Hartford, Connecticut:

To Victor Morris of Hartford, Conn., is popularly given the credit of suggesting "Flag Day," the occasion being in honor of the adoption of the American flag on June 14, 1777. The city of Hartford observed the day in 1861, carrying out a program of a patriotic order, praying for the success of the Federal arms and the preservation of the Union.

The observance apparently did not become a tradition.

1885, Bernard J. Cigrand

Working as a grade school teacher in Waubeka, Wisconsin, in 1885, Bernard J. Cigrand held the first recognized formal observance of Flag Day at the Stony Hill School. The school has been restored, and a bust of Cigrand also honors him at the National Flag Day Americanism Center in Waubeka.

From the late 1880s on, Cigrand spoke around the country promoting patriotism, respect for the flag, and the need for the annual observance of a flag day on June 14, the day in 1777 that the Continental Congress adopted the Stars and Stripes.

He moved to Chicago to attend dental school and, in June 1886, first publicly proposed an annual observance of the birth of the United States flag in an article titled "The Fourteenth of June," published in the Chicago Argus newspaper. In June 1888, Cigrand advocated establishing the holiday in a speech before the "Sons of America," a Chicago group. The organization founded a magazine, American Standard, in order to promote reverence for American emblems. Cigrand was appointed editor-in-chief and wrote articles in the magazine as well as in other magazines and newspapers to promote the holiday.

On the third Saturday in June 1894, a public school children's celebration of Flag Day took place in Chicago at Douglas, Garfield, Humboldt, Lincoln, and Washington Parks. More than 300,000 children participated, and the celebration was repeated the next year.

Cigrand became president of the American Flag Day Association and later of the National Flag Day Society, which allowed him to promote his cause with organizational backing. Cigrand once noted he had given 2,188 speeches on patriotism and the flag.

Cigrand lived in Batavia, Illinois, from 1913 to 1932.

Cigrand generally is credited with being the "Father of Flag Day," with the Chicago Tribune noting that he "almost singlehandedly" established the holiday.

1888, William T. Kerr

William T. Kerr, a native of Pittsburgh and later a resident of Yeadon, Pennsylvania, founded the American Flag Day Association of Western Pennsylvania in 1888, and became the national chairman of the American Flag Day Association one year later, serving as such for fifty years.  He attended President Harry S. Truman's 1949 signing of the Act of Congress that formally established the observance.

1889, George Bolch

In 1889, the principal of a free kindergarten, George Bolch, celebrated the Revolution and celebrated Flag Day, as well.

1891, Sarah Hinson
Sarah Hinson, a school teacher in Buffalo, NY began Flag Day exercises, (teaching the children to salute the Flag and repeat the Pledge of Allegiance) to instill in her pupils proper respect for the nation's flag, holding the first ceremony in 1891. She chose June 14th because that was the day in 1777 when the Continental Congress accepted the design of the "American" Flag.

1893, Elizabeth Duane Gillespie

In 1893, Elizabeth Duane Gillespie, a descendant of Benjamin Franklin and the president of the Colonial Dames of Pennsylvania, attempted to have a resolution passed requiring the American flag to be displayed on all Philadelphia's public buildings. In 1937, Pennsylvania became the first state to make Flag Day a legal holiday.

The Elizabeth Duane Gillespie Junior High School was added to the National Register of Historic Places in 1989.

1907, Benevolent and Protective Order of Elks

American fraternal order and social club the Benevolent and Protective Order of Elks has celebrated the holiday since the early days of the organization and allegiance to the flag is a requirement of every member. In 1907, the BPOE Grand Lodge designated by resolution June 14 as Flag Day. The Grand Lodge of the Order adopted mandatory observance of the occasion by every Lodge in 1911, and that requirement continues.

The Elks prompted President Woodrow Wilson to recognize the Order's observance of Flag Day for its patriotic expression.

1913, City of Paterson, New Jersey

During the 1913 Paterson silk strike, IWW leader "Big" Bill Haywood asserted that someday all of the world's flags would be red, "the color of the working man's blood."  In response, the city's leaders (who opposed the strike) declared March 17 to be "Flag Day," and saw to it that each of the city's textile mills flew an American flag.  This attempt by Paterson's leaders to portray the strikers as un-American backfired when the strikers marched through the city with American flags of their own, along with a banner that stated:

World War II rebranding as United Nations Day
For Flag Day 1942, President Franklin D. Roosevelt launched an international "United Flag Day" or "United Nations Day", celebrating solidarity among the World War II Allies, six months after the Declaration by United Nations. It was observed in New York City as the "New York at War" parade, and throughout the United States and internationally from 1942 to 1944.

Observance of Flag Day 

The week of June 14 (–; –; –) is designated as "National Flag Week." During National Flag Week, the president will issue a proclamation "urging the people to observe the day as the anniversary of the adoption on June 14, 1777, by the Continental Congress of the Stars and Stripes as the official flag of the United States of America."  The flag should also be displayed on all government buildings. Some organizations, such as the towns of Quincy, Massachusetts and Dedham, Massachusetts, hold parades and events in celebration of America's national flag and everything it represents.

The National Flag Day Foundation holds an annual observance for Flag Day on the second Sunday in June. The program includes a ceremonial raising of the national flag, the recitation of the Pledge of Allegiance, the singing of the national anthem, a parade and other events.

The Star-Spangled Banner Flag House in Baltimore, Maryland, birthplace of the 1813 flag that inspired Francis Scott Key (1779–1843) to pen his famous poem a year later, has celebrated Flag Day since the 1927. In that year, a museum was created in the home of flag-banner-pennant maker Mary Pickersgill on the historic property.

The annual celebrations on Flag Day and also Defenders Day in Maryland (September 12, since 1814) commemorate the Star-Spangled Banner and its creator Mary Pickersgill, for the huge emblem that flew over Fort McHenry guarding Baltimore harbor during the British Royal Navy's three days attack in the Battle of Baltimore during the War of 1812 (1812–1815).

The Betsy Ross House, home of legendary Betsy Ross, has long been the site of Philadelphia's observance of Flag Day.

Coincidentally, June 14 is also the date for the annual anniversary of the Bear Flag Revolt in California. On June 14, 1846, 33 American settlers and mountain men arrested the Mexican general in command at Sonoma, and declared the "Bear Flag Republic" on the Pacific Ocean coast as an independent nation. A flag emblazoned with a bear, a red stripe, a star and the words "California Republic" was raised to symbolize independence from Mexico of the former province of Alta California. The Bear Flag was adopted as California's state flag upon joining the Union as the 31st state in 1850, after being annexed by the United States following the Mexican–American War of 1846–1849. Prominently flying both the US and state flags on June 14 is a tradition for some Californians.

Notes

References

External links

 Tip for Celebrating Flag Day
 Tribute to the Flag by the Scottish Rite of Freemasonry
 "Star power: 200 years of change" – USA Today
 National Flag Day Foundation
 "Unhappy Flag Day" by Adam Goodheart, New York Times, June 13, 2011.
 Presidential Proclamations on Flag Day

United States
Flags of the United States
United States flag flying days
Observances in the United States by presidential proclamation
June observances
State holidays in the United States